Kiyasovo (Kijasa) is a rural locality (a selo) and the administrative center of Kiyasovsky District of the Udmurt Republic, Russia. Population:

References

Rural localities in Udmurtia
Sarapulsky Uyezd